= Ernst Kalkowsky =

Ernst Louis Kalkowsky (1851–1938) was a German geologist and museum scientist. His paper "Oolith and Stromatolith im Norddeutschen Bundsandstein" was one of the most important contributions to understand stromatolitic structures.

== Works ==
- Elemente der Lithologie, 1886.
- Der Nephrit des Bodensees. Dresden: Wilhelm Baensch, 1906.
- Oolith and Stromatolith im Norddeutschen Bundsandstein, 1908.
